Philotheus served as Greek Patriarch of Alexandria between 1435 and 1459.

References
 

15th-century Patriarchs of Alexandria